Park Tae-geon (born 8 May 1991) formerly known as Park Bong-go is a South Korean athlete specialising in the 400 metres. He represented his country at the 2011 World Championships without reaching the semifinals.

Competition record

Personal bests
100 metres – 10.30 (2018)
200 metres – 20.40 (+0.3 m/s) (Jeongseon 2018)
400 metres – 45.63 (Daegu 2010)

References

1991 births
Living people
South Korean male sprinters
Asian Games silver medalists for South Korea
Asian Games medalists in athletics (track and field)
Athletes (track and field) at the 2014 Asian Games
Athletes (track and field) at the 2018 Asian Games
World Athletics Championships athletes for South Korea
Medalists at the 2014 Asian Games
21st-century South Korean people